Wolf Englert (1924–1997) was a German painter and art director who designed the sets of a number of German films and television series.

Selected filmography
 Hubertus Castle (1954)
 The Sinful Village (1954)
 The Angel with the Flaming Sword (1954)
 Request Concert (1955)
 The Daring Swimmer (1957)
 Rosemary (1958)
 I Was All His (1958)
 The Blue Sea and You (1959)
 Three Moves to Freedom (1960)
 The Last of Mrs. Cheyney (1961)
 Don't Tell Me Any Stories (1964)
 Aunt Frieda (1965)
 Once a Greek (1966)
 When Ludwig Goes on Manoeuvres (1967)

References

Bibliography
 Herzogenrath, Bernd. The Films of Edgar G. Ulmer. Scarecrow Press, 2009.

External links

1924 births
1997 deaths
German art directors